The following is a list of Premier League of Belize stadiums that have hosted a Premier League match since its inception in 2012.

Following the 2012 Premier League, there have been a total of eleven stadiums that have hosted a Premier League match.

Stadiums

External links
 Premier League of Belize – The Official Website of the Premier League of Belize

Football venues in Belize
Belize Premier Football League home stadiums